The Laramie, North Park and Pacific Railroad and Telegraph Company was a short lived railroad line in the U.S. state of Wyoming. In 1880, a group of Albany County businessmen proposed a rail line west from Laramie across the Medicine Bow Range. The Union Pacific Railway soon gained control of the line. Most of the line was subsequently abandoned, but in 1900 successor Union Pacific Railroad bought the easternmost .

See also 
 List of defunct Wyoming railroads

References 

Interstate Commerce Commission, 44 Val. Rep. 1 (1933), Valuation Docket No. 1060: Union Pacific Railroad Company

Defunct Wyoming railroads
Predecessors of the Union Pacific Railroad
Railway companies established in 1880
Railway companies disestablished in 1900
1880 establishments in Wyoming Territory
American companies disestablished in 1900